Dorothy Shepherd-Barron (née Cunliffe; 24 November 1897 – 20 February 1953) was a tennis player from Great Britain who competed in the 1924 Summer Olympics.

Tennis career
At the 1924 Summer Olympics she teamed with Evelyn Colyer to win a bronze medal in the women's doubles event. In the singles event, she reached the quarterfinals, losing to Julie Vlasto.

Between 1920 and 1939, she participated in 15 editions of the Wimbledon Championships. In the singles event, her best result was reaching the quarterfinals in 1921 (losing to Mabel Clayton) and 1924 (losing to Phyllis Satterthwaite. She reached the final of the Wimbledon doubles event in 1929 with Phyllis Howkins Covell, losing in straight sets to compatriots Peggy Saunders Michell and Phoebe Holcroft Watson, a result that was repeated in the final of the U.S. National Championships. Two years later, in 1931, she and partner Phyllis Mudford King won the doubles title, defeating Doris Metaxa Howard and Josane Sigart in three sets.

In mixed doubles, she was a Grand Slam finalist on four occasions, partnering Lewis Deane, Leslie Godfree and Bunny Austin.

Personal life
On 23 September 1921, she married engineer Wilfred Shepherd-Barron in Bombay, India. One of their sons is John Shepherd-Barron, credited as the inventor of the ATM, and their youngest son, Richard Shepherd-Barron, was a racing driver in the 1950s and 1960s, finishing 13th overall at the 1962 Le Mans race. She died in a car accident in Cambridgeshire on 20 February 1953.

Grand Slam finals

Doubles: 3 (1 title, 2 runner-ups)

Mixed doubles: 4 (4 runner-ups)

References

External links
 
 
 
 databaseOlympics profile

1897 births
1953 deaths
British female tennis players
Olympic bronze medallists for Great Britain
Olympic tennis players of Great Britain
Tennis players at the 1924 Summer Olympics
Olympic medalists in tennis
Grand Slam (tennis) champions in women's doubles
Medalists at the 1924 Summer Olympics
Road incident deaths in England
English female tennis players
People from Broadland (district)
Tennis people from South Yorkshire
Wimbledon champions (pre-Open Era)